"Omoi" is the first single of Japanese singer and voice actress Nana Mizuki. It was released on December 6, 2000, by King Records. It is her first single under the name Nana Mizuki.

Track listing 
 
Lyrics: Chokkyu Murano
Composition: Ataru Sumiyoshi
Arrangement: NOV
Image song for drama CD Shōnen Shin Karon
A new version Omoi -pedigreed mix- is featured in her album Supersonic Girl
 
Lyrics: Chokkyu Murano
Composition: Ataru Sumiyoshi
Arrangement: NOV
Opening theme for anime television series Mamimume☆Mogacho
 
Lyrics: Chokkyu Murano
Composition, arrangement: NOV
  (vocalless ver.)
  (vocalless ver.)

References

Nana Mizuki songs
2000 debut singles
King Records (Japan) singles